Euthriostoma is a genus of sea snails, marine gastropod mollusks in the family Buccinidae, the true whelks.

Species
Species within the genus Euthriostoma include:
 Euthriostoma saharicum (Locard, 1897)
Species brought into synonymy
 Euthriostoma gliberti Marche-Marchad & Brébion, 1977 : synonym of Euthriostoma saharicum (Locard, 1897)

References

 Marche-Marchad I. & Brebion P. 1977. Sur un Buccinidé nouveau d'affinité miocène vivant au large du Sénégal. Comptes Rendus Hebdomadaires des Séances de l'Académie des Sciences (série D), 285(4): 339-342 
 Gofas, S.; Le Renard, J.; Bouchet, P. (2001). Mollusca. in: Costello, M.J. et al. (eds), European Register of Marine Species: a check-list of the marine species in Europe and a bibliography of guides to their identification. Patrimoines Naturels. 50: 180-213.
 Bouchet P. & Warén A. (1986 ["1985"]). Mollusca Gastropoda: Taxonomical notes on tropical deep water Buccinidae with descriptions of new taxa. in: Forest, J. (Ed.) Résultats des Campagnes MUSORSTOM I et II Philippines (1976, 1980). Tome 2. Mémoires du Muséum national d'Histoire naturelle. Série A, Zoologie. 133: 457-499

External links
  Neave, Sheffield Airey. (1939-1996). Nomenclator Zoologicus vol. 1-10 Online 

Buccinidae
Monotypic gastropod genera